The Bear Lake Monster is a being appearing in folklore near Bear Lake, on the Utah–Idaho border.

The myth originally grew from articles written in the 19th century by Joseph C. Rich, a Mormon settler in the area, purporting to report second-hand accounts of sightings of the creature. However, he later recanted the stories.

In recent years the monster is considered to be a tourist attraction. The last reported sighting of the monster was in 2002.

Descriptions

Not all descriptions of the Bear Lake Monster agree, but one team of folklorists stated that it “is reported to resemble a serpent, but with legs about eighteen inches long on which it marauds along the shoreline.” One article reported that the creature had “a large undulating body, with about 30 feet of exposed surface, of a light cream color, moving swiftly through the water, at a distance of three miles from the point of observation.” Others reported seeing a monster-like creature which went faster than a locomotive and had a head variously described as being similar to that of a cow, otter, crocodile or a walrus (minus the tusks). Its size was reported to be at least fifty feet long, and certainly not less than forty. Some have reported spikes along its spine, starting from the bottom of the head all the way along its body. Some sightings even spoke of a second member of the species and smaller monsters as well.

History

An 1868 article in the Deseret News announced that “The Indians have a tradition concerning a strange, serpent-like creature inhabiting the waters of Bear Lake…. Now, it seems this water devil, as the Indians called it, has again made an appearance. A number of our white settlers declare they have seen it with their own eyes. This Bear Lake Monster, they now call it, is causing a great deal of excitement up here” and then the author—Joseph C. Rich—went on to relate several sightings of the creature in recent times. The article created a stir in Salt Lake City and within a month “a news staff member… quizzed many Bear Lake people and found hardly a person who doubted it.”

LDS Church leaders took an interest in the monster and when they visited the area on preaching tours, took the opportunity to speak firsthand with the residents of the region. They stated that they “had a conversation with brother Charles C. Rich and other brethren from Bear Lake Valley, respecting the monster which has been seen in the lake” and found that they declared that the testimony that had been given “by so many individuals, who have seen these creatures in so many places and under a variety of circumstances” that they (the locals) considered the story to be “indisputable.” The Deseret News continued to publish articles about the Monster—skeptically at times and defensively at others—while other local newspapers turned to attack the stories of a water devil. The Salt Lake Tribune even went as far as to quip that the Monster was “twin brother to the devil and cousin to Brigham [Young].”

Articles about the Bear Lake Monster continued to appear over the next several years, either reciting new sightings of the Bear Lake Monster as well as similar creatures in other rivers and lakes in the Utah Territory or calling the sightings into question. The number of alleged appearances of lake monsters all across northern Utah caused some people to speculate that there was an underground channel connecting the Great Salt Lake and other waterways to Bear Lake. Interest was high enough that at one point even LDS Church president Brigham Young decided to investigate the claims to find out whether the story was “an honest tale of a serpent or only a fish story” and went as far as sending a large rope to Paris, Idaho to aid in capturing the monster.

Young wasn’t the only person interested in capturing the creature. One local resident proposed using a large baited hook attached to a twenty-foot cable and three hundred yards of one-inch rope, at the end of which was a to be a large buoy with a flagstaff inserted and an anchor to keep it in a perpendicular position. From the buoy one hundred yards of three-quarter-inch rope was to be extended to a tree onshore. When captured, it was hoped that the monster could be exploited for its wondrous proportions in the show business, in competition with the famous P. T. Barnum.

Interest eventually died down in the subject and the phenomenon faded from public memory. Twenty-six years following his articles and allegations, Joseph C. Rich finally admitted that it had all been a “wonderful first-class lie.”

Modern Bear Lake Monster sightings 

Sighting of the Bear Lake Monster continued even after Rich admitted that he fabricated the original sightings as a hoax. A 1907 letter published in a Logan, Utah newspaper claimed that two men had seen the Bear Lake behemoth attack their camp and kill one of their horses, a four-year-old claimed to see it in 1937, and a Boy Scout leader spoke of seeing it in 1946. The last reported sighting of the monster was in June 2002, when Bear Lake business owner Brian Hirschi claims to have seen the monster.

The monster has become a part of local folklore, partly due to sporadic sightings and partly in jest. For years a Bear Lake Monster Boat—a tourist boat-shaped to look like a green lake monster—offered a 45-minute scenic cruise of Bear Lake with folklore storytelling. Another self-parody that the locals have done is to fill a float in the Garden City, Utah Raspberry Days parade with local children and label it “The Real Bear Lake Monsters.” On another occasion, during the 1996 Raspberry Days, a competition was organized in Garden City to have local school children name the leviathan. The judges decided on the name Isabella, which had been submitted by an eight-year-old girl.

References

External links
 Bear Lake Monster Digital Folklore Collection, Utah State University

American legendary creatures
Idaho culture
Mormon folklore
Utah culture
Water monsters